John Bennett Johnston Jr. (born June 10, 1932) is a retired American attorney, politician, and later lobbyist. A member of the Democratic Party, Johnston represented Louisiana in the U.S. Senate from 1972 to 1997.

Beginning his political career when elected as a state representative from Caddo Parish in 1964, Johnston also served in the state senate before winning election to the U.S. Senate.

Early life and education
Johnston was born in Shreveport, Louisiana, to the attorney John Bennett Johnston (1894–1977) and the former Wilma Lyon (1904–1996). Johnston attended the private elementary and junior high Southfield School in the South Highlands neighborhood of Shreveport. He was inducted into the Southfield Hall of Fame in 1994.

After Southfield, Johnston attended and graduated from C. E. Byrd High School in Shreveport. He attended the United States Military Academy in West Point, New York, and Washington and Lee University in Lexington, Virginia.

In 1956, Johnston graduated from Louisiana State University Law Center in Baton Rouge. He was admitted to the bar that same year. Johnston attended The JAG School at the University of Virginia and entered U.S. Army JAG Corps. He served in the United States Army, Judge Advocate General Corps in Germany from 1956 to 1959.

Marriage and family

Johnston married Mary Gunn, a native of Natchitoches. Johnston is a member of the Baptist Church; his wife is Roman Catholic. They had four children together: Bennett, Hunter, Mary, and Sally, who were raised as Catholic.
	  		  		 		 
The Johnstons' daughter Sally married Timothy J. Roemer from Indiana. He became a politician, serving as a Democratic U.S. Representative of Indiana, 1991–2003. He was appointed to the 9/11 Commission to investigate the terrorist attacks. He also served as US Ambassador to India.
	 
The Johnstons have a total of ten grandchildren.

Political life

Johnston had joined the Democratic Party and decided to run for office, beginning at the local level. In 1964, he was elected to the Louisiana House of Representatives, along with two Republicans, Morley A. Hudson and Taylor W. O'Hearn, and two other Democrats from Caddo Parish, Algie D. Brown and Frank Fulco. Hudson and O'Hearn were the first Republicans to serve in the legislature since Reconstruction, reflecting what would become a wholesale shift of conservative whites from the Democratic to the Republican party throughout the South following passage of civil rights legislation in 1964 and 1965.

In 1966, Johnston hired Ralph Perlman to the legislative staff; he was a business graduate of Columbia University in New York City. Soon Governor John McKeithen appointed Perlman as state budget director, where he served from 1967 to 1988.

In 1968, Johnston was elected at-large to the Louisiana State Senate, along with fellow Democrats Jackson B. Davis and Joe LeSage. One of the candidates whom he defeated was Republican Tom Stagg, later appointed as a judge of the United States District Court for the Western District of Louisiana in Shreveport.

In 1970, State Senator Johnston outlined his proposal for a toll road to connect Shreveport with South Louisiana, as there was no north–south interstate highway at the time. Johnston said the state gasoline tax was bringing in only 20 percent of what was needed to construct such a north–south highway. Therefore, he proposed using tolls to raise the necessary revenue, as they applied only to users. While his proposal was not approved, later the federally subsidized Interstate 49 was built, linking Shreveport with Lafayette. Most of the highway was opened in the early 1990s. Interstate connections were created from Lafayette to Baton Rouge and New Orleans.

In 1971, Johnston ran for governor of Louisiana. Harmon Drew Jr. headed the Johnston college campaign. Drew said that Johnston represented a "new outlook this state must have." Johnston narrowly lost this race by 4,488 votes to Edwin Edwards in the runoff election of the Democratic primary. This was the last Louisiana gubernatorial election to be held prior to the state's adoption of the nonpartisan blanket primary in 1975. Edwards' margin was fewer than two votes per precinct. Drew later served as a judge of the Louisiana Court of Appeal for the Second Circuit,

Edwards defeated Republican David C. Treen in the general election for governor held on February 1, 1972. Treen was elected to the U.S. House in November 1972.  He was re-elected, serving until his election as governor in 1979.

U.S. Senate campaigns of 1972, 1978, and 1984
In 1972, Johnston challenged the long-term incumbent, Allen J. Ellender, for the Democratic nomination to the U.S. Senate. Ellender died during the campaign, and Johnston, with powerful name identification stemming from his gubernatorial bid months earlier, won the primary easily. In the primary, Johnston received 623,076 votes (79.4 percent); Frank T. Allen, 88,198 votes (11.2 percent), and the deceased Ellender, 73,088 votes (9.3 percent).

Johnston defeated Republican Ben C. Toledano, a New Orleans attorney and a former candidate for mayor of New Orleans, and former Governor John McKeithen of Columbia, a fellow Democrat who ran as an Independent in the general election because the filing period was not reopened upon Ellender's death.

McKeithen, the first Louisiana governor to serve two consecutive terms, left office six months prior to the Senate election in order to conduct his campaign. Johnston received 598,987 votes (55.2 percent); McKeithen, 250,161 (23.1 percent), and Toledano's 206,846 (19.1 percent). Another 28,910 voters (2.6 percent) chose the American Independent Party candidate, Hall Lyons, a Shreveport native who had relocated in the oil business to Lafayette. (The position was filled by appointment from July to November 1972 by Governor Edwards' first wife, Elaine Schwartzenburg Edwards, the interim senator.)

The creation of the interim position was done to swear in Johnston immediately upon certification of his election, allowing him to gain an edge in seniority over other senators who first took office during the 93rd Congress. Johnston's freshman classmates included Joe Biden (D-Delaware), who served seven terms before being elected as Vice President and later President, Sam Nunn (D-Georgia), who served four terms, Jesse Helms (R-North Carolina), who served five terms, and Pete Domenici (R-New Mexico), who served six terms.

In the office, Senator Johnston cultivated good relationships with the Louisiana media. The state's newspaper gave Johnston wide coverage. The Alexandria Daily Town Talk's managing editor, Adras LaBorde, for instance, gave extensive coverage to both Johnston and Senate colleague Russell B. Long.

For a time, Johnston's director of special projects was James Arthur Reeder (1933–2012), a former Shreveport and Washington, D.C., attorney, and owner of a chain of radio stations. Like Johnston, Reeder was later inducted into the Louisiana Political Museum and Hall of Fame in Winnfield. Later Reeder organized voter registration drives in Caddo Parish to empower minority voters. In 2009, Reeder narrated the inaugural parade of U.S. President Barack H. Obama.

In 1978, Johnston defeated Democrat State Representative Woody Jenkins of Baton Rouge in the nonpartisan blanket primary, 498,773 (59.4 percent) to 340,896 (40.6 percent). (Jenkins later shifted to the Republican Party.)

In 1984, Johnston faced minor opposition from Robert Max Ross (1933–2009), a small businessman from Mangham in Richland Parish in Northeast Louisiana. Several other minor candidates also filed against Johnston in the primary, but none made a showing.

Some Republicans had encouraged former Governor David C. Treen to run against Johnston. Treen filed but withdrew in the wake of his loss the previous year for governor. Ross ran as the best-known of the Republican candidates. The tally was 838,181 votes (85.7 percent) for Johnston, 86,546 votes (8.9 percent) for Ross, and others took 52,745 votes (5.4 percent).

Johnston v. Duke

Johnston's closest re-election race was in 1990 against State Representative David Duke, a former Ku Klux Klansman and Republican candidate, who was not endorsed by his party's leadership. Louisiana State Senator Ben Bagert of New Orleans dropped out of the primary race in a bid to try to prevent a runoff battle between Johnston and Duke. Eight Republican U.S. senators endorsed Johnston over Duke. These included Ted Stevens and Frank Murkowski of Alaska, David Durenberger and Rudy Boschwitz of Minnesota, John Danforth of Missouri, William Cohen of Maine, Warren Rudman of New Hampshire, and Nancy Landon Kassebaum of Kansas.

The HUD Secretary at the time, Jack Kemp, also endorsed Johnston.

Johnston defeated Duke in the primary, 752,902 votes (53.9 percent), to 607,391 votes (43.5 percent), far less than expected. Other candidates took the remaining 35,820 votes (2.5 percent).
Johnston retired after his fourth term ended in 1997; he was succeeded by his choice for the seat, fellow Democrat Mary Landrieu of New Orleans, daughter of Jimmy Carter's HUD Secretary and former New Orleans Mayor Moon Landrieu.

Notable achievements 
Considered a conservative within the Democratic caucus, Johnston procured Senate passage in 1981 of a measure to limit school busing for purposes of racial balance to a distance of no more than five miles or fifteen minutes of time. Johnston's bill passed the Republican-controlled Senate 60 to 39, with liberal Republican Lowell Weicker of Connecticut leading the opposition. House Speaker Tip O'Neill of Massachusetts blocked the measure from being considered by the House of Representatives, and it did not pass the Congress.

Johnston broke with his party in 1991 to authorize the use of military force in Operation Desert Storm in Iraq. He also broke ranks to support the narrowly achieved confirmation of Clarence Thomas as associate justice of the United States Supreme Court. In 1987, Johnston had voted with his Democratic majority against President Ronald W. Reagan's choice of Robert Bork, former D.C. Appeals Court Judge, for elevation to the Supreme Court.

Johnston was one of the few Senate Democrats to vote against the Budget Act of 1993, which was strongly supported by President Bill Clinton. He repeatedly voted against the Balanced Budget Amendment and giving the President the line-item veto, both of which were measures strongly favored by fiscal conservatives in both parties. On foreign policy issues, he frequently voted with more liberal Democrats to terminate restrictions on travel to communist Cuba, and in support of the United Nations and foreign aid. Johnston was the only member of either house of Congress to vote against a 1995 resolution to allow Taiwan's president Lee Teng-hui to visit the United States.

During his tenure as Chairman of the Senate Committee on Energy and Natural Resources, he was recognized as the nation's pre-eminent legislator on energy policy. One of his major concerns was the threat of anthropegenic climate change.

Johnston was a firm advocate of the Flag Desecration Amendment. He opposed abortion and most gun control measures.

In 1988, Johnston sought the position of Senate Majority Leader but lost to George J. Mitchell of Maine. From 1972 to 1987, Johnston served alongside fellow Democratic Senator Russell Long, with whom he worked closely to deliver federal spending to Louisiana. Johnston and Long gained authorization of the Cane River National Heritage Area in Natchitoches Parish in 1994, which stimulated tourism in the region. Johnston delivered a eulogy at Long's funeral in 2003.

Later life
Since leaving the Senate, Johnston formed Johnston & Associates LLC, a lobbying group. In 2008, Steptoe & Johnson, a major international law firm, formed a "strategic alliance" with Johnston. Steptoe added three members from Johnston & Associates to the firm.

Johnston and former Senator Howard Baker of Tennessee co-chaired the National Parks Second Century Commission.

In 1997, Johnston was elected to Chevron's board of directors. He had left the board by 2011.

Currently, Johnston is one of the advisory directors at Freeport-McMoRan Copper & Gold and Angeleno Group, an energy-based investment group.

Legacy and honors
Southern University at Shreveport named its video conferencing room in Johnston's honor. It is located inside Stone Hall, named for Jesse N. Stone, the late civil rights activist and former president of the Southern University System.
In 2010, Johnston received the National Parks Conservation Association Centennial Leadership Award.
A quadrangle on Tulane University's main campus is named “The J Bennett Johnston Quadrangle” in his honor.  A building on Tulane University's downtown campus is named “The J. Bennett Johnston Health and Environmental Research Building also in his honor.

References

External links
 

|-

|-

|-

|-

|-

1932 births
Living people
United States Army officers
Louisiana lawyers
Democratic Party Louisiana state senators
Louisiana State University Law Center alumni
C. E. Byrd High School alumni
United States Military Academy alumni
Washington and Lee University alumni
Democratic Party members of the Louisiana House of Representatives
Politicians from Shreveport, Louisiana
Democratic Party United States senators from Louisiana
American lobbyists
Baptists from Louisiana
The Judge Advocate General's Legal Center and School alumni
Members of Congress who became lobbyists